Joseph Lutumba is a Congolese lyricist and the author of the Congolese national anthem. When the Democratic Republic of the Congo was renamed to the Republic of Zaire, he was also the one who composed the new national anthem known as La Zaïroise. La Zaïroise was eventually replaced when the country was renamed back to the Democratic Republic of the Congo by the original national anthem   "Debout Congolais".

References 

Living people
Democratic Republic of the Congo songwriters
Year of birth missing (living people)
National anthem writers
People from Kongo Central
Academic staff of the University of Lubumbashi
21st-century Democratic Republic of the Congo people